Port St. Joe is a city located at the intersection of U.S. Highway 98 and State Road 71 and the county seat of Gulf County, Florida. As of the 2020 census,the population was 3,357. This was a decline from 3,644 as of the 2000 census.

History
St. Joseph was founded in 1835 by businessmen from nearby Apalachicola, which was troubled by legal conflict over land titles. It was mostly abandoned in 1841 after a yellow fever epidemic; a storm surge produced by a hurricane in 1844 destroyed what structures remained.

During the Civil War, Florida was a leading producer of salt for the Confederate army. On September 15, 1862, a Union officer on board the USS Kingfisher wrote that he an his men had sent a demand to the extensive salt works at Saint Joseph that they cease production. When the work was not halted, the Kingfisher went into Saint Joseph bay, sent at least 50 men in land, and destroyed the salt works.

In the early 20th century a new settlement was founded close to the original after the arrival of the Apalachicola Northern Railroad in 1909. It appears that the more informal "Port St. Joe" was adopted for official use around this time.

The community was extensively damaged by Hurricane Michael on October 10, 2018.

Geography

Port St. Joe is located in southern Gulf County at  (29.807968, –85.297684), within the Florida Panhandle and along the Emerald Coast. The city limits extend into St. Joseph Bay, an arm of the Gulf of Mexico.

U.S. Route 98 passes through Port St. Joe as Monument Drive in the north and Constitution Drive in the south. US 98 leads northwest along the Gulf shore  to Panama City and southeast  to Apalachicola. Florida State Road 71 (Cecil G. Costin Sr. Boulevard) leads northeast  to Wewahitchka.

This portion of the town has been dubbed "Highland View".

Demographics

As of the census of 2000, there were 3,644 people, 1,402 households, and 1,030 families residing in the city. The racial makeup of the city was 68.52% White, 30.10% African American, 0.22% Native American, 0.22% Asian, 0.05% from other races, and 0.88% from two or more races. Hispanic or Latino of any race were 0.55% of the population.

There were 1,402 households, out of which 28.8% had children under the age of 18 living with them, 54.2% were married couples living together, 14.8% had a female householder with no husband present, and 26.5% were non-families. 24.9% of all households were made up of individuals, and 14.0% had someone living alone who was 65 years of age or older. The average household size was 2.48 and the average family size was 2.94.

In the city, the population was spread out, with 23.6% under the age of 18, 6.7% from 18 to 24, 24.6% from 25 to 44, 23.6% from 45 to 64, and 21.5% who were 65 years of age or older. The median age was 42 years. For every 100 females, there were 88.4 males. For every 100 females age 18 and over, there were 80.7 males.

The median income for a household in the city was $33,800, and the median income for a family was $39,489. Males had a median income of $30,244 versus $21,111 for females. The per capita income for the city was $16,205. About 11.2% of families and 13.0% of the population were below the poverty line, including 16.2% of those under age 18 and 11.7% of those age 65 or over.

Schools and libraries
Port St. Joe, within Gulf District Schools, has one elementary school, with Dolphins as mascot. It has a joint middle-high school, Port St. Joe High School, with Sharks as the mascot. The school colors are purple and gold. There is also a small private school, Faith Christian School, which has the lions as its mascot. All of the public schools are located on one development strip set aside under the Department of Education. This begins with the elementary school and its playground and continues with the football stadium, a quarter mile running track, and finally the high school and adult school stretching a distance of about 5 city blocks. Port St. Joe also has a community college that offers two year associate degrees.

Port St. Joe has a library co-located with the senior citizens center, sheriff's office, courthouse, and animal shelter off State Road 71.

The Florida Constitutional Convention of 1838 took place in St. Joe. There is a museum and monument commemorating this event.

Local media

Radio
 WEBZ 99.3 FM (Urban)
 W216BT 91.1 FM (repeater of WFSW-FM, Panama City)
 WDBW-LP, 97.3 FM (Long Avenue Baptist Church, repeater of Bible Broadcasting Network)
 WOYS 106.5 FM Classic Rock/Blues/Beach Music
 WFCX 100.5 FM Tropical Rock
 WTKP Classic Rock

Newspaper
The Star

Transportation
Port St. Joe is served by a variety of transportation modes.

Water
From the GIWW, barges can be moved inland on various river systems including the Mississippi River, Tombigbee River Waterway System, and the Apalachicola River. The Apalachicola River is Gulf County's eastern boundary.

Existing facilities include a manufacturer of chemical lime from dolomite, a chemical plant, a 9 million ton/year dry bulk barge-to-rail transloading terminal, and a builder of dive-cruise ships.

Rail 
The AN Railway previously served the industries and port of Port St. Joe and had a history of transporting a variety of products including wood chips and other forest products, chemicals, and coal. In light of the latter, most of its  mainline consisted of heavy duty,  rail on concrete ties. The AN connected with the Class I CSX Transportation at Chattahoochee, Florida. There is currently no rail service in Port St. Joe.

Highway
Gulf County's highway transportation needs are met with three main corridors: U.S. Route 98 along the coast and through Port St. Joe providing a route west to Panama City and east to Apalachicola, State Road 22 westward from Wewahitchka to Panama City, and State Road 71 from Port St. Joe northward toward Alabama and Georgia. Further, State Road 71 provides a low-traffic connection to Interstate 10, with only two traffic signals between Port St. Joe and Interstate 10 over the  distance.

Industries

Highland View was once a milltown, with a paper mill and Arizona Chemical Company plant on adjacent sides. However, both shut down around 2000.

Notable people 

 Greg Lewis, retired NFL running back
 Calvin Pryor former NFL strong safety
 Roman Quinn, MLB player
 Jason Shoaf, member of the Florida House of Representatives
 Clifford Chester Sims, United States Army officer and Medal of Honor recipient

See also
Centennial Building
Constitution Convention Museum State Park
Port Theatre Art and Culture Center
St. Joseph, Gulf County, Florida
St. Joseph Catholic Mission Church

References

External links

 City of Port St. Joe official website
 Gulf County Tourist Development Council
 Gulf County Chamber of Commerce
 The Star, newspaper that serves Port St. Joe; available in full-text with images in Florida Digital Newspaper Library

 
St. Joe, Port
County seats in Florida
Cities in Gulf County, Florida
Cities in Florida
Populated coastal places in Florida on the Gulf of Mexico
Populated places established in 1835
1835 establishments in Florida Territory